Peter Augustus Jay may refer to:

 Peter Augustus Jay (lawyer) (1776–1843), eldest son of Founding Father and first United States Chief Justice, John Jay
 Peter Augustus Jay (born 1821) (1821–1855), son of Peter Augustus Jay (1776–1843) and grandson of John Jay
 Peter Augustus Jay (diplomat) (1877–1933), American diplomat and great great grandson of Peter Augustus Jay (1776–1843)

See also
 1838 Peter Augustus Jay House, named for Peter Augustus Jay, a New York lawyer
 Peter Jay (disambiguation)